Irish Pine was the name of three ships operated by Irish Shipping Ltd:

Ship names